The following lists events that happened during 2009 in Cape Verde.

Incumbents
President: Pedro Pires
Prime Minister: José Maria Neves

Events
June 10: Cidade Velha became a UNESCO World Heritage Site
December 22: reconstruction of São Pedro Airport (now Cesária Évora Airport) finished, it became an international airport

Arts and entertainment
May 25: Mayra Andrade's album Stória, stória... released
October 26: Cesária Évora's album Nha Sentimento released

Sports

Sporting Clube da Praia won the Cape Verdean Football Championship

Deaths
April 5: Lela Violão (b. 1929)
September 9: Tuna Mascarenhas (b. 1944)
September 28: Manuel de Novas (b. 1938), writer

References

 
Years of the 21st century in Cape Verde
2000s in Cape Verde
Cape Verde
Cape Verde